Tavakalo Kailes (born 14 July 1973) is a Vanuatuan athlete, born on Efate.

Kailes competed at the 1996 Summer Olympics held in Atlanta, he entered the 800 metres where he finished 7th out of eight runners in his heat and so didn't qualify for the next round.

References

External links
 

1973 births
Living people
People from Shefa Province
Vanuatuan male middle-distance runners
Athletes (track and field) at the 1996 Summer Olympics
Olympic athletes of Vanuatu
Athletes (track and field) at the 1998 Commonwealth Games
Commonwealth Games competitors for Vanuatu